This is a list of notable wind turbine manufacturers and businesses that manufacture major wind turbine components.

Small wind turbine manufacturers 

 Bornay (Spain)
 Enessere (Italy)
 Hi-VAWT (Taiwan)
 quietrevolution (United Kingdom)
 Southwest (USA) – closed 20 February 2013 which is now Primus windpower
 TUGE Energia (Estonia)
 Urban Green Energy (USA) – no longer manufacturing small wind turbines as of 2018
 Harmony Turbines (USA)

Large wind turbine manufacturers

Current manufacturers 

 China Guodian Corporation (China) – turbine brand United Wind Power
 CRRC (China)
 CSIC (Chongqing) – HZ Wind Power (China)
 Envision Energy (China)
 Goldwind (China)
 SANY (China)
 Shanghai Electric (China) (SEwind)
 Sinovel (China)
 NovaWind (Russia) – Subsidiary of Rosatom
 GE Renewable Energy (France)
 PacWind (USA)
 Elecon Engineering (India)
 Inox Wind (India)  
 RRB Energy Limited (India)
 Suzlon (India)
 World Wind (India)
 Enercon (Germany)
 Nordex SE (Germany)
 UNISON (South Korea)
 Hanjin (South Korea)
 Doosan (South Korea)
 Hyosung (South Korea)
 Hyundai Heavy Industries (South Korea)
 Hitachi (Japan) – acquired the wind turbine business of Fuji Heavy Industries in 2012 
 Japan Steel Works (Japan)
 Machine Sazi Arak (Iran)
 Mitsubishi Heavy Industries (Japan)
 Končar (Croatia)
 Mapna (Iran)
 Siemens Gamesa Renewable Energy (Germany/Spain)
 STX Windpower (South Korea / The Netherlands)
 TECO (Taiwan)
 Vergnet (France)
 Vestas (Denmark) – the world's largest manufacturer of wind turbines
 WEG (Brazil)
 Xant (Belgium)

Past manufacturers 

 Acciona (Spain) merged with Nordex 
 Northern Power Systems (USA)
 DeWind (Germany/USA) – subsidiary of Daewoo Shipbuilding & Marine Engineering (South Korea)
 Alstom Wind (Spain) – subsidiary of General Electric since 2015
 Enron Wind (now defunct) – wind-turbine manufacturing assets bought by General Electric in 2002
 Fuji Heavy Industries (Japan) – the wind turbine business was acquired by Hitachi in 2012
 Gamesa (Spain)
 NEG Micon (Spain) – was bought by Gamesa 
 NEG Micon – now part of Vestas
 Nordic Windpower (USA) – bankrupted in 2012
 Raum Energy Inc. (Canada)
 Scanwind (Norway) – bought by General Electric in 2009
 Senvion (Germany) – assets bought by Siemens Gamesa Renewable Energy in 2019
 Prokon (Germany)
 WinWinD (Finland)
 Frisia (Germany)
 Clipper (USA)
 DSTN (DSME Trenton) (Canada)
 Windflow (New Zealand)

See also 

 AWEA (American Wind Energy Association)
 EWEA (European Wind Energy Association)
 List of Danish wind turbine manufacturers
 List of offshore wind farms
 Lists of wind farms
 Wind power in the People's Republic of China

References

External links 

 
Wind turbine
Wind Turbine
Wind turbine manufacturers
Renewable energy commercialization